Eurasian Migrant Crisis may refer to:

Refugees of the war in Donbass
European migrant crisis